Ignác Teiszenberger (born 11 December 1880, date of death unknown) was a Hungarian cyclist. He competed in two events at the 1912 Summer Olympics.

References

External links
 

1880 births
Year of death missing
Hungarian male cyclists
Olympic cyclists of Hungary
Cyclists at the 1912 Summer Olympics
Cyclists from Budapest
Sportspeople from the Austro-Hungarian Empire